Scaglia can refer to;

People
 Cesare Alessandro Scaglia, abbot at the Staffarda Abbey
 Franco Scaglia, Italian writer
 Girolamo Scaglia, Italian painter 
 Luigi Scaglia, Italian football player
 Massimiliano Scaglia, Italian football player
 Patrick Scaglia, American businessman
 Renata Scaglia, Italian discus thrower
 Silvio Scaglia, Italian entrepreneur
 Valentina Scaglia, Italian dancer

Other
 Scaglia (mammal), an extinct mammal genus